Lomamyia fulva is a species of beaded lacewing in the family Berothidae. It is found in North America.

References

Further reading

 

Hemerobiiformia
Articles created by Qbugbot
Insects described in 1940